Nandyala Srinivasa Reddy (1918 – February 20, 2019) was a Member of Legislative Assembly, Andhra Pradesh a leader of the Telangana Rebellion, and Communist Party of India political activist. He is popularly known as NSR. NSR advocated against feudalistic policies.

Early life and Telangana rebellion

NSR was born in an affluent landlord family in Koppolu, Nalgonda. After finishing his schooling in Suryapet and Warangal during the 1930s he attended the Andhra Mahasabha. He became a member of the Andhra Mahasabha and used to actively arrange meetings and educate youth about the atrocities of the feudal lords and Razakars in the Telangana region. Later on he joined the Telangana Rebellion and headed the Nalgonda Taluka Squad. During the movement NSR was arrested and was given death sentence along with others. NSR later escaped along with Nalla Narsimhalu from the Hyderabad court prison.

Political life

Nandyala Srinivasa Reddy was elected as the Member of the Legislative Assembly from Nakrekal Constituency during the 1962 General Elections. He played a key role in the CPI(M) party activities during his active years as the member of the district and state committees. NSR was part of the special screening committee established by the Government of India to examine and approve the pension applications of freedom fighters who participated in the Telangana Armed Struggle.

References 

1918 births
2019 deaths
Indian centenarians
Members of the Andhra Pradesh Legislative Assembly
Men centenarians